Kumbatine  is a national park located in New South Wales, Australia,  northeast of Sydney.

Geography
Glencoe Creek is located wholly within Kumbatine National Park.

The most prominent and highest mountain in the national park is Mount Kippara with an altitude of 484 meters.

See also
 Protected areas of New South Wales

References

National parks of New South Wales
Protected areas established in 1999
1999 establishments in Australia